The 22nd Actors and Actresses Union Awards ceremony was held on 3 June 2013 at the Teatro Coliseum in Madrid.

In addition to the competitive awards Ada Colau received the '' award, Julieta Serrano the '' career award and Antonio Malonda the Special Award.

Winners and nominees 
The winners and nominees are listed as follows:

Film

Television

Theatre

Newcomers

References 

Actors and Actresses Union Awards
2013 in Madrid
2013 television awards
2013 film awards
2013 theatre awards
June 2013 events in Europe